Final tables of Lithuanian Championship of 2005 are presented below. The Lithuanian Football Federation (LFF) organized three football leagues: A Lyga (the highest), 1 Lyga (second-tier), and 2 Lyga (third-tier), which comprised three regional zones - one less than the previous season.

A Lyga

1 Lyga

2 Lyga

2 Lyga zone South

2 Lyga zone West

2 Lyga zone North

References
 
 
 
 
 

LFF Lyga seasons
1
Lith
Lith